Joculator minutissimus is a species of minute sea snail, a marine gastropod mollusc in the family Cerithiopsidae. The species was described by Thiele in 1925.

References

Gastropods described in 1925
minutissimus